University Airport  is a public-use airport located two nautical miles (4 km) west of the central business district of Davis, a city in Yolo County, California, United States. It is owned by the University of California and operated by Transportation Services of the University of California, Davis. Of the ten campuses in the UC system, Davis is the only one with its own airport.

Although most U.S. airports use the same three-letter location identifier for the FAA and IATA, this airport is assigned EDU by the FAA but has no designation from the IATA.

The airport opened in 1946 and was acquired by the University of California four years later. 100LL fuel and transient aircraft tiedowns are available. Two fixed base operators are located on the field: the Cal Aggie Flying Farmers flight school and Davis Air Repair.

Facilities and aircraft 
For the 12-month period ending June 30, 2010, the airport had 24,475 aircraft operations, an average of 67 per day: 90% general aviation, 10% air taxi and <1% military.

References

External links 
 

Airports in Yolo County, California
Buildings and structures in Davis, California
University and college airports
University of California, Davis